Nectomys is a genus of rodent in the tribe Oryzomyini of family Cricetidae. It is closely related to Amphinectomys and was formerly considered congeneric with Sigmodontomys. It consists of five species, which are allopatrically distributed across much of South America: Nectomys grandis in montane Colombia; Nectomys palmipes on Trinidad and in nearby Venezuela, Nectomys apicalis in the western margins of the Amazon biome, Nectomys rattus in much of Amazonia, and Nectomys squamipes in the Atlantic Forest of Brazil. These species are generally semiaquatic, are normally found near water, and are commonly called water rats.

Notes

References

Literature cited

 
Rodent genera
Taxa named by Wilhelm Peters
Taxonomy articles created by Polbot